Pentateucha curiosa, the hirsute hawkmoth, is a moth of the family Sphingidae. The species was first described by Charles Swinhoe in 1908. It is known from Nepal, north-eastern India, Yunnan in south-western China, northern Thailand and northern Vietnam.

The wingspan is about 104 mm. Adults are on wing in January in Vietnam and from mid-December to mid-February in northern Thailand.

The larvae probably feed on Ilex species (including I. triflora). In captivity, larvae have been reared on leaves of I. aquifolium.

References

Sphingulini
Moths described in 1908